Rio Azul, Paraná is a municipality in the state of Paraná in the Southern Region of Brazil.

The Judiciary (Court of Rebouças) 
 Court Judge: James Byron W. Bordignon

State Public Prosecutor's Office (Court of Rebouças) 
 State Public Prosecutor / Public Attorney: Murilo Cezar Soares e Silva
 Brazil: Art.129, II, of the Federal Constitution, which, combined with art.197, assigns to Public Attorneys the institutional function of ensuring the proper application of health laws by the Public Powers and services of public relevance.
http://www.mp.pr.gov.br

See also
List of municipalities in Paraná

References

Municipalities in Paraná